James Rupert Jacob Murdoch (born 13 December 1972) is a British-American businessman, the younger son of media mogul Rupert Murdoch, and was the chief executive officer (CEO) of 21st Century Fox from 2015 to 2019. 

He was the chairman and CEO for Europe and Asia of News Corporation until 2013 when it was split into News Corp and 21st Century Fox.  He was formerly a director of News Corp and was a member of the office of the chairman. 

Until April 2012, he was the chairman and CEO of Sky plc, Europe and Asia, where he oversaw assets such as News International (British newspapers; publisher of The News of the World newspaper), Sky Italia (satellite television in Italy), Sky Deutschland, and STAR TV (satellite television in Asia).

He was executive chairman of News International from 2007 until February 2012. He previously held a non-executive chair at British Sky Broadcasting, in which News Corporation had a controlling minority stake. In April 2012, he was forced to resign as chairman of BSkyB in the wake of the ongoing phone hacking scandal, in which he was implicated. He was reappointed chairman of the company following its merger with its Italian and German sister companies to form Sky plc.

He was formerly an executive vice-president of News Corporation (the controlling shareholder of BSkyB) and served on the board of directors of News Datacom and of News Corporation.

In May 2012, a highly critical UK Parliamentary report said that Murdoch "showed wilful ignorance of the extent of phone-hacking" and found him "guilty of an astonishing lack of curiosity" over the issue. It went on to say that both Murdoch and his father, Rupert, "should ultimately be prepared to take responsibility" for wrongdoing at the News of the World and News International.

Murdoch is a British citizen by birth and a naturalised US citizen. He lost Australian citizenship when his father became a US citizen, but he is eligible to reclaim it.

Early life
Murdoch was born at Wimbledon Hospital in Wimbledon, London, England. He is the fourth child of billionaire media mogul Rupert Murdoch's six children, and the third with Scottish-born journalist and author Anna Murdoch Mann (née Torv).

As a youngster James was regarded as the brightest of the Murdoch children, but also considered something of a rebel. He first came to public notice as a 15-year-old intern at the Sydney Daily Mirror but made headlines in the rival The Sydney Morning Herald after he was photographed asleep on a sofa at a press conference.

Murdoch attended Horace Mann School in New York City and graduated in 1991. He then studied film and history at Harvard University, where he was a member of the Harvard Lampoon. He dropped out of university in 1995 without completing his studies. With university friends Brian Brater and Jarret Myer, he backed the establishment of Rawkus Records, an independent hip hop record label. The company was bought by News Corporation in 1998.

Business career
In 1996, Murdoch joined News Corporation and was appointed chairman of Festival Records. He took charge of News Corporation's internet operations, where he invested in a series of ventures, including financial website TheStreet and the short-lived online music site Whammo, with mixed results. He also continued to contribute cartoons to US magazine Gear.

He is credited with sparking his father's interest in the internet, and he reportedly tried to persuade his father to buy internet company PointCast for US$450 million. It was subsequently sold to another company for $7 million.

After installing a new management team at Festival, Murdoch purchased the controlling 51% share of Mushroom Records in 1999, and the merged group was rebranded as Festival Mushroom Records (FMR). It was at first thought that News Corporation might use FMR as the foundation of a new international entertainment company, but FMR struggled while Murdoch was in charge and after his departure its fortunes declined rapidly.  FMR was closed in late 2005 and its remaining assets were sold: the recording catalogue was sold to the Australian division of Warner Music for A$10 million in October 2005, and the publishing division was sold to Michael Gudinski a month later, for an undisclosed sum.

In May 2000, Murdoch was appointed chairman and chief executive of News Corporation's ailing Asian satellite service Star Television, which at the time was losing £100 million a year, and he moved to Hong Kong.

In February 2003, Murdoch became a director of BSkyB. Later that year, he controversially became CEO of BSkyB, in which News Corporation owns a controlling minority stake. His appointment sparked accusations of nepotism, with some commentators and shareholders feeling that the job had not been opened to outsiders and that Murdoch was too young and inexperienced to run one of the UK's top companies (upon appointment he was by far the youngest chief executive of a FTSE 100 company).

Following the surprise resignation of his brother Lachlan Murdoch from his executive positions at News Corporation in July 2005, James was viewed as his father's heir-apparent.

In December 2007, Murdoch stepped down as CEO from BSkyB and was appointed non-executive chairman of the company (a position formerly held by his father, Rupert).

In a related announcement, Murdoch also took "direct responsibility for the strategic and operational development of News Corporation's television, newspaper, and related digital assets in Europe, Asia, and the Middle East." This included holdings such as News International, Sky Italia, STAR Group ltd and possibly other News Corporation related assets. He was based at News International's headquarters in Wapping, East London.

In February 2009, Murdoch was appointed a non-executive director with the British pharmaceutical company GlaxoSmithKline.

In August 2009, Murdoch delivered the MacTaggart Memorial Lecture at the Edinburgh International Television Festival, in which he attacked the BBC and UK media regulator Ofcom calling the BBC's expansion "chilling" and also said: "In this all-media marketplace, the expansion of state-sponsored journalism is a threat to the plurality and independence of news provision, which are so important for our democracy." The BBC chairman, Sir Michael Lyons officially responded, "We have to be careful not to reduce the whole of broadcasting to some simple economic transactions. The BBC's public purposes stress the importance of the well-tested principles of educating and informing, and an impartial contribution to debate in the UK."

In April 2010, Murdoch and his associate Rebekah Brooks entered the offices of The Independent to complain about an advertisement campaign by the newspaper. The advertisement read, "Rupert Murdoch won't decide this election—you will."

In April 2014, it was announced that Murdoch would join the board of advertising start-up True[X] Media.

In June 2015, his father, Rupert, announced that he would be leaving his position as CEO of 21st Century Fox and James would take over the position.

In January 2016, Murdoch became the chairman of Sky, Britain's subscription broadcaster.

In July 2017, Murdoch became an independent director on the board of Tesla. 

In October 2018, Murdoch left Sky after Comcast took the majority control of the company.

In March 2019, 21st Century Fox was sold to The Walt Disney Company, ending Murdoch's tenure as CEO.

In July 2020, Murdoch resigned from the board of directors of News Corp. His resignation letter stated that his resignation was "due to disagreements over certain editorial content published by the Company’s news outlets and certain other strategic decisions".

In 2022 multiple sources report Lupa India, the investment company set up by Uday Shankar and James Murdoch, is in the final stages of picking up a 39 per cent stake in Viacom18.

Phone hacking scandal and aftermath

On 7 July 2011, James Murdoch announced the closure of the British tabloid newspaper the News of the World in the wake of a phone hacking scandal.

On 19 July 2011, along with his father, Rupert, he appeared at a hearing of the Commons Culture, Media and Sport Committee. He appeared once again before the same committee on 10 November 2011.  James maintained that until late in 2010 he was unaware that more than one "rogue reporter" from the News of the World tabloid had been involved in phone hacking. This statement was challenged by the formal legal manager and editor for the newspaper, who claimed they had informed James of the "Transcript for Neville" email, a potential "smoking gun" indicating several of the newspaper's journalists may have been involved, during the settlement negotiations with Gorden Taylor in 2008 and alerted him to the potential liability if this document became public.

On 22 July 2011, Britain's prime minister, David Cameron, said that Murdoch has "questions to answer in Parliament," a day after former top executives of the News of the World accused the News Corporation executive of giving "mistaken" evidence.

In November 2011, British newspapers reported that Murdoch had resigned as chairman of News Group Newspapers, the holding company above The Sun, News of the World and Times Newspapers Ltd, itself owner of The Times and The Sunday Times. News Group Newspapers is the company subject to a series of lawsuits, all related to the phone hacking scandal. James Murdoch's resignation was also said to be related to the 12 October 2011 resignation of another Dow Jones executive, Andrew Langhoff, after a company whistleblower revealed an editorial scam and questionable circulation dealings at The Wall Street Journal Europe.

In February 2012, News Corp announced that Murdoch would be stepping down as executive chairman of its British newspaper arm. The company said he would remain deputy chief operating officer of News Corp and focus on the company's international TV business, including continued responsibility for BSkyB. He stepped down also from the GlaxoSmithKline board.

In April 2012, he stood down as chairman of BSkyB, but remained on the board. He was replaced as chairman by Nicholas Ferguson.

In September 2012, Murdoch was criticised by the British Office of Communications (Ofcom), which concluded that he "repeatedly fell short of the conduct to be expected of as a chief executive and chairman" and that his lack of action in relation to phone hacking was "difficult to comprehend and ill-judged".

Personal life
Murdoch married Kathryn Hufschmid in 2000; the couple have three children, Anneka (born 2003), Walter (born 2004), and Emerson (born 2008). Kathryn works for the Clinton Climate Initiative, a charitable foundation set up by the former U.S. President, Bill Clinton in 2006. In 2013, the couple launched Quadrivium Foundation. Murdoch also donated money to the Clinton Foundation, the nonprofit organization run by Chelsea, Bill, and Hillary Clinton.

Murdoch was instrumental in the formation of Sky Procycling and is a keen cyclist himself. He maintains an early morning gym routine and has a black belt in karate.

In 2020, Murdoch and his wife each donated US$615,000 to the Biden campaign.

See also
 News media phone hacking scandal
 News International phone hacking scandal
 Phone hacking scandal reference lists
 Metropolitan police role in phone hacking scandal

References

External links

Published articles at Journalisted

James Murdoch at Forbes

James Murdoch at Los Angeles Times

1972 births
Living people
Australian people of Scottish descent
British media executives
British people of Australian descent
The Harvard Lampoon alumni
Harvard University people
Horace Mann School alumni
James
News Corporation people
People associated with the News International phone hacking scandal
British emigrants to the United States
Businesspeople from New York City
Chief operating officers
People who lost Australian citizenship